Gipcy is a commune in the Allier department in central France.

Population

Administration 
Chantal Brouttet, re-elected in March 2014 after municipal elections, was forced to resign for health reasons. She has been replaced in November 2015 by David Delegrange, who was re-elected in 2020. In October 2022 Aude Aufauvre was elected mayor.

See also
Communes of the Allier department

References

Communes of Allier
Allier communes articles needing translation from French Wikipedia
Bourbonnais